Sova (Czech/Slovak feminine: Sovová) is a surname. Notable people with this surname include:

 Aleš Sova (born 1991), Czech ice hockey player
 Antonín Sova (1864–1928), Czech poet
 Dan Șova (born 1973), Romanian politician
 Evgeny Sova (born 1980), Israeli journalist
 Joe Sova (born 1988), American ice hockey player
 Lyubov Sova (born 1979), Russian philologist
 Peter Sova (1944–2020), Czech-American cinematographer
 Romen Sova (1938–2001), Ukrainian toxicologist
 Vahur Sova (born 1956), Estonian architect

See also
 
 Sowa (surname)

Czech-language surnames
Slovak-language surnames
Ukrainian-language surnames